The Mushawe River (alternative spelling Mushawi River) is a right-bank tributary of the Mwenezi River in Zimbabwe. It rises in the Nemande mountain area and flows through the Maranda area to join the Mwenezi River downstream of Manyuchi Dam, Mwenezi District.

Hydrology 

The Mzingane River is an ephemeral river with flow generally restricted to the months when rain takes place (November to March). However, the lower Mushawe River bed forms an alluvial aquifer, which  generally holds water year-round.

In places, permanent to semi-permanent pools occur, providing habitat for crocodiles.

Development 

The Mushawe River is dammed at Dengenya. The dam was built to supply water for irrigation but is currently full of sand. There are also some small dams on the minor tributaries of the Mushawe River. Water for Maranda (No 1) Business Centre is abstracted from the alluvial aquifer below the Mushawe River, slightly upstream of the photo shown above.

References 

Rivers of Zimbabwe
Geography of Masvingo Province
Mwenezi (District)
Mwenezi River